Lakas Tama is the debut studio album by comedian Vice Ganda, released by Vicor Music June 15, 2011. It has 8 tracks, 5 original songs, and 3 revivals.

Track listing

References

2011 albums